Marcus Nilsson may refer to:

 Marcus Nilsson (decathlete) (born 1991), Swedish athlete
 Marcus Nilsson (footballer) (born 1988), Swedish footballer
 Marcus Nilsson (ice hockey) (born 1991), Swedish ice hockey player
 Marcus Nilsson (volleyball) (born 1982), Swedish volleyball player

See also 
 Marcus Nilson (born 1978), Swedish ice hockey player